The 2010 Asian Women's Club Volleyball Championship was the 11th edition of the AVC Club Championships. The tournament was held in Tri Dharma Hall, Gresik, Surabaya, Indonesia.

Pools composition
The teams are seeded based on their final ranking at the 2009 Asian Women's Club Volleyball Championship.

Preliminary round

Pool A

|}

|}

Pool B

|}

|}

Classification 9th–10th

|}

Final round

Quarterfinals

|}

5th–8th semifinals

|}

Semifinals

|}

7th place

|}

5th place

|}

3rd place

|}

Final

|}

Final standing

Awards
MVP:  Nootsara Tomkom (Federbrau)
Best Scorer:  Onuma Sittirak (Federbrau)
Best Spiker:  Onuma Sittirak (Federbrau)
Best Blocker:  Olga Drobyshevskaya (Zhetyssu)
Best Server:  Korinna Ishimtseva (Zhetyssu)
Best Setter:  Yuki Kawai (JT Marvelous)
Best Libero:  Kotoe Inoue (JT Marvelous)

External links
Asian Volleyball Confederation

Asian
Volleyball
International volleyball competitions hosted by Indonesia